Emmanuel N. Monfort (born July 2, 1989) is a Filipino basketball coach and former player. He is an assistant coach for the NLEX Road Warriors of the Philippine Basketball Association (PBA). He was selected 16th overall in the 2012 PBA draft by Barako Bull Energy Cola.

Monfort won three championships during his collegiate career with the Ateneo Blue Eagles in the UAAP from 2009 to 2011.

PBA career
Monfort, often called The Minion, the 16th overall pick in the 2012 PBA draft out of Ateneo De Manila University, played in just 12 games due to various injuries, but when he was on the court, he showed that he could run a team like a veteran in his first team as a professional PBA player.

On October 31, 2013, he was traded to Barangay Ginebra San Miguel to bolster their backcourt sending Robert Labagala to Barako Bull.

On August 25, 2015, he was traded to Barako Bull Energy with Josh Urbiztondo and Jens Knuttel in exchange for Nico Salva and a future first-round pick.

PBA career statistics

As of the end of 2019 season

Season-by-season averages

|-
| align=left | 
| align=left | Barako Bull
| 12 || 27.8 || .361 || .328 || .769 || 2.3 || 5.0 || .8 || .0 || 9.1
|-
| align=left | 
| align=left rowspan="2" |Barangay Ginebra
| 34 || 9.9 || .271 || .260 || .750 || 1.4 || 1.4 || .4 || .0 || 1.9
|-
| align=left | 
| 20 || 14.5 || .389 || .310 || .833 || 2.7 || 1.7 || .9 || .1 || 2.8
|-
| align=left | 
| align=left | Barako Bull / Phoenix / NLEX
| 34 || 16.2 || .357 || .318 || .833 || 1.9 || 2.6 || .9 || .0 || 4.6
|-
| align=left | 
| align=left rowspan="3" |NLEX
| 23 || 13.6 || .467 || .364 || .800 || 1.9 || 1.6 || 1.0 || .0 || 3.1
|-
| align=left | 
| 20 || 11.1 || .408 || .333 || .533 || 1.9 || 1.7 || .7 || .0 || 2.7
|-
| align=left | 
| 3 || 14.6 || .600 || .571 || .667 || 2.3 || 4.0 || .3 || .0 || 6.7
|-class=sortbottom
| align=center colspan=2 | Career
| 146 || 15.4 || .408 || .355 || .741 || 2.1 || 2.6 || .7 || .0 || 4.4

References

1989 births
Living people
Barako Bull Energy players
Barangay Ginebra San Miguel players
Basketball players from Iloilo
Filipino men's basketball players
NLEX Road Warriors players
Philippine Basketball Association All-Stars
Phoenix Super LPG Fuel Masters players
Point guards
Southeast Asian Games gold medalists for the Philippines
Southeast Asian Games competitors for the Philippines
Southeast Asian Games medalists in basketball
Philippines men's national basketball team players
Sportspeople from Iloilo City
Ateneo Blue Eagles men's basketball players
Competitors at the 2011 Southeast Asian Games
Barako Bull Energy draft picks